This is the list of the star names in the constellation Draco.

α Dra 

 Thuban:
 ＜ (ar) ثعبان thu'bān, serpent, the last part of Ra's al-Thu'bān. (See β Dra.)
 Adib:
 ＜ (ar) الذئبة al-Dhi'b, the Wolf. (See θ Dra.)
 the Dragon's Tail:
 called among seamen.
 Yu Choo:
 ＜ (zh) 右枢, the Right-hand Pivot.

β Dra 

 Rastaban:
 ＜ (ar) س الثعبان Ra's al-Thu'bān the Head of the Serpent, transferred from γ Dra. (See γ Dra.)
 Alwaid:
 ＜ (ar) al-‘Awā'idh the Old Mother( Camel)s, for β, γ, ξ, and ν Dra.
 ＜ (ar) al-‘Awwād the Lute-player. (See μ Dra.)
 Asuia:
 ＜ (ar) al-Shujā‘ the Sea-serpent.

γ Dra 

 Eltanin (Etamin, Etanin):
 ＜ (ar) راس التنين  Ra's al-Tinnīn the Head of the Dragon.
 Rastaben (Rasaben, Rastaban):
 ＜ mistransliterated form of Ra's al-Tinnīn.
 the Zenith-star:

See also 
 List of stars in Draco
 List of star names

Notes

References 
 
 
 

Star names
Draco